Fillon Government may refer to:

 , the French government under President Nicolas Sarkozy from May to June 2007
 , the French government under President Nicolas Sarkozy from June 2007 to 2010
 Third Fillon government, the French government under President Nicolas Sarkozy from 2010 to 2012

See also
 Cabinet of François Fillon